Fort Europa is the third album by the Swedish hip hop group Looptroop. It was released in 2005 by Burning Heart Records and is entirely produced by Embee. An instrumental version of the album has also been released.

Track listing
Dm-87 - 1:16
Fort Europa - 4:13
21 Grams - 4:25
Chana Masala - 4:04
Trinfidelity - 2:31
Night Train - 5:09
21 Bars - 1:02
Rainbow Faces - 4:12
Hurricane George feat. Timbuktu & Chords - 4:00
Trinsanity - 1:57
Sparkplug - 3:06
Trrism - 4:39
Carneval - 4:29
Heavy Rains - 5:52
Trincest - 2:04
Unilateral Communication - 5:31

External links 
 Band's official website
 

2005 albums
Looptroop Rockers albums
Burning Heart Records albums